is a passenger railway station in located in the city of  Hirakata, Osaka Prefecture, Japan, operated by the private railway company Keihan Electric Railway.

Lines
Goten-yama Station is served by the  Keihan Main Line, and is located 23.5 km from the starting point of the line at Yodoyabashi Station.

Station layout
The station has two ground-level opposed side platforms connected by an unground passage.

Platforms

Adjacent stations

History
The station was opened on May 25, 1929.

Passenger statistics
In fiscal 2019, the station was used by an average of 13,918 passengers daily.

Surrounding area
Fukuda General Hospital
Gotenyama Shrine
Gotenyama Library
 Hirakata Nagisa High School
 Kansai University of Foreign Studies(Gotenyama Campus)
 Kinki College of Information Technology

See also 
List of railway stations in Japan

References

External links

Official home page 

Railway stations in Osaka Prefecture
Railway stations in Japan opened in 1929
Hirakata, Osaka